Eagle Island (Gaelic: Oileán sa Tuaidh) is a small uninhabited island at the north end of the Mullet Peninsula in Erris off the north west County Mayo Atlantic Ocean coast in Ireland.
There is a lighthouse on the island.

References

External links
 http://www.flickriver.com/photos/ruthann/4543431649/

 

Islands of County Mayo